Dato’ Ian William Blelloch  (2 August 1901 – 25 March 1982) was a British colonial administrator in Malaya.

Blelloch was educated at Dunfermline High School and Edinburgh University. He was a cadet of the Federated Malay States (1926), District Officer of Krian (Class III), District Officer of Raub (1932) (Class IV), Acting British Adviser for Terengganu and the last posting British Adviser for Perak (1951–1956). His monthly salary as the Adviser for Perak was M$1500.

Blelloch was awarded the Perak Meritorious Service Medal in 1953. He was appointed CMG in 1955, Officer of the Order of St John in 1957, and Commander of that Order in 1964. He was created Dato’ by the Sultan of Perak in 1956.

Sources and references

WorldStatesmen - Malaysia
Arkib Negara Malaysia

1901 births
1982 deaths
People educated at Dunfermline High School
Alumni of the University of Edinburgh
History of Perak
Administrators in British Malaya
Companions of the Order of St Michael and St George